Vladimir Yazdovsky (1913–1999) was a Soviet space program medical scientist.

Yazdovsky was a veteran surgeon and army doctor who joined the Institute for Aviation and Medeicine in Moscow in 1948. There, in the early 1950s, Yazdovsky assisted Sergei Korolev in tests using small animals in sub-orbital spaceflight. His team of researchers helped gather strays from Moscow and helped design various safety measures such as space suits and life-support systems.

In 1957 he prepared the dog Laika, the first animal to orbit, the Earth for Sputnik 2. In 1960 Yazdovsky prepared the dogs Belka and Strelka for Korabl-Sputnik 2, the first spaceflight to launch animals into orbit and return them alive to Earth.

References

1913 births
1999 deaths
Soviet scientists
Soviet space program personnel
Soviet military doctors
Soviet Air Force officers
Soviet surgeons